Proahaetulla is a monotypic genus of snake in the family Colubridae. It contains only one species, the keeled vine snake (Proahaetulla antiqua), which is endemic to the Western Ghats of India. Its natural habitat is montane rainforests of southern Western Ghats.

The species was first discovered in 2011, when an individual was found in the Agasthyamalai Hills of Tamil Nadu and Kerala. It was initially thought to be a new species of Ahaetulla, as it looked very similar to the species A. dispar. However, genetic analyses found it to be deeply divergent from any member in the genus Ahaetulla, so it was classified in its own genus. Both the genus and species were ultimately described in 2019.

Taxonomy
It is considered to be the sister taxon to the genus Ahetulla, which it diverged from during the mid-Oligocene. Due to its age, Proahaetulla may be one of the oldest monotypic lineages of snakes to still persist in the Western Ghats. The study that described Proahaetulla also found that the clade containing it and Ahaetulla was a sister group to the genus Dryophiops. Proahaetulla is also the first deeply divergent snake genus to be described from the Western Ghats in over a century; numerous Indian snake species have had new genera created to reclassify them from the genera they were originally classified in, but Proahaetulla is completely new, possibly having never been encountered by science prior to its description as a new genus and species.

Description
Dorsal scales smooth and arranged in 15 rows at midbody;strongly keeled in the sacral region of males. Two loreals, 1st in contact with the nasals. Ventrals 196-207; subcaudals 160-165; anal plate divided. Dorsally light green and two yellowish lateral lines present;  very similar in appearance to Ahaetulla dispar. Ventral colouration whitish or greenish. Total length 1200mm.

Habits and distribution
It is a diurnal and semi-arboreal species found in the high elevation evergreen forests and grasslands of Western Ghats.

References  

Colubrids
Snakes of Asia
Reptiles of India
Endemic fauna of the Western Ghats
Reptiles described in 2019
Proahaetulla